This is a list of major companies or subsidiaries headquartered in the Miami metropolitan area.

The economy in Miami has largely diversified with less emphasis on tourism, a number of companies are based in the area, many with connections to Latin America. Because of its proximity to Latin America, Greater Miami serves as the headquarters of Latin American operations for more than 1,100 multinational corporations that adds up to more than $221 billion in annual revenues., including AIG, American Airlines, Cisco, Disney, Exxon, Kraft Foods, Microsoft, Oracle, SBC Communications, Sony, Visa International, and Wal-Mart.

The following 5 companies are Fortune 500 companies based in the metropolitan area.

(Ranking. Company Name (City) Annual Revenues)

160. Lennar (Miami), $16.4 billion 
192. Office Depot (Boca Raton), $12.1 billion 
205. World Fuel Services (Miami), $11.3 billion 
212. AutoNation (Fort Lauderdale), $11 billion 
426. Ryder System (Miami), $5 billion

The following companies are major companies with regional HQ in the metropolitan area with a Latin American focus.

Apex Call Centers (Fort Lauderdale)
Alcatel-Lucent (Miramar)
Amcor PET Packaging Latin America (Miramar)
American Airlines (Coral Gables)
APL (Miami)
Canon Latin America (Miami)
Caterpillar Americas Services (Miami)
Cisco Systems (Miami)
DHL Global Forwarding Latin America (Plantation)
Eastman Chemical Latin America, Inc. (Miami)
Electrolux Home Products International (Miami)
Gap International Sourcing (Americas) (Miami)
H.I.G. Capital Management (Miami)
Hewlett-Packard Latin America (Miami)
Hilton International (Miami)
Ingram Micro (Miami)
Komatsu Latin America (Miami)
Kraft Foods (Coral Gables)
Marriott International (Weston)
Microsoft Latin America (Ft. Lauderdale)
Millicom (Tigo) (Coral Gables)
Nokia Corp (Miami), moved Latin America Operations
Novartis Pharmaceuticals Corp. (Miami)
Oracle Latin America (Miami)
Paccar International, Latin America (Miami)
SAP International (Miami)
Schering-Plough Corporation (Miami Lakes)
Tech Data (Miami)
Visa International (Miami)
Western Union Latin America (Miami)

The following are major companies with US/Americas HQ in the metropolitan area that also do business in the US.

Amadeus IT Group (Doral) - Spain
Bacardi U.S.A. (Coral Gables) - Bermuda
Benetton USA Corp (Miami Beach) - Italy
Central Concrete Supermix Inc. (Miami) - USA
Club Med (Coral Gables) - France
COTIA (USA) Ltd, Inc. (Miami) - Brazil
Danone Americas (Coral Gables) - France
EADS Socata North America, Inc. (Pembroke Pines) - France
Ekman and Co. (Miami) - Sweden
Embraer Aircraft Holding (Ft. Lauderdale) - Brazil
Global Crossing USA (Miami) - USA
Gossip Stone TV (Aventura) - USA
Hellmann Worldwide Logistics, Inc. (Doral) - Germany
Iberia Airlines of Spain (Miami) - Spain
Itau Private Bank International (Miami) - Brazil
MAPEI (Deerfield Beach) - Italy
Marine Harvest Inc. (Miami) - Norway
Martinair, the Americas (Doral) - Netherlands
Nipro Medical Corporation (Miami) - Japan
OHL USA (Davie) - Spain
Odebrecht Construction, Inc. (Coral Gables) - Brazil
Rinker Materials Corporation (West Palm Beach) - Mexico
Simclar, Inc. (Hialeah) - UK
South African Airways (Ft. Lauderdale) - South Africa
Telefónica USA, Inc. (Miami) - Spain
Teva Pharmaceutical (Miami) - Israel
Turbana (Coral Gables) - Colombia
VINCI (Miami) - France
Wackenhut Corp (Palm Beach Gardens) - USA
ZLB Plasma Services (Boca Raton) - USA

The following companies are the largest 20 local employers with a HQ in the metropolitan area.

 American Airlines - 9,000
 Precision Response Corporation - 5,000
 Costa Farms - 5,000
 Royal Caribbean International - 4,000
 Office Depot - 3,800
 Carnival Corporation & plc - 3,500
 Wackenhut Corp- 3,000
 Motorola - 2,500
 Assurant Solutions - 2,100
 Burger King - 2,000
 Pollo Tropical - 2,000
 Beckman Coulter - 1,800
 Cordis - 1,800
 NCL Corp - 1,500
 Interval Leisure Group - 1,130
 Boston Scientific - Miami - 1,000
 OHL USA - 1,000
 Securitas Security Services USA - 1,000
 UPS - 1,000

References

South Florida

South Florida
Miami-related lists